Noé Elias Pamarot (born 14 April 1979) is a French former professional footballer who played as a central defender. Before moving to Spain, Pamarot played for Portsmouth in the Premier League. He is a right-footed defender who is also known for his great strength. Pamarot has previously played for Martigues, Nice and Tottenham Hotspur and also had a brief loan spell at Portsmouth in the 1999–2000 season.

Club career

Tottenham Hotspur
In the 2004–05 season he played 23 times for Tottenham Hotspur before seriously injuring his right knee at the start of April in a match against Birmingham City at St Andrew's. Before that he headed the winning goal away at Everton, one of his two goals for the club, the other coming in the FA Cup against Nottingham Forest.

Portsmouth
Pamarot was transferred from Tottenham to Portsmouth in January 2006 in a £7.5 million deal that also took Sean Davis and Pedro Mendes to Portsmouth. He scored his first Portsmouth goal away against Arsenal in December 2006. Matthew Taylor's free kick was headed on by David Thompson and rebounded off the post into the path of Pamarot. He scored again in the next game, with another header, in a 3–1 home win over Sheffield United. Pamarot subsequently scored a brace of goals against Leeds United in the League Cup in 2007, as well as a 30-yard strike against Newcastle United in the Premier League. He was an unused substitute as Portsmouth won the 2008 FA Cup Final. His only contribution to the victorious campaign was playing the full 90 minutes of their fourth round win over Plymouth Argyle.

Pamarot was released by Portsmouth following the expiration of his contract in the summer of 2009.

Hércules
On 28 August 2009, Pamarot signed for the Spanish team Hércules on an initial two-year contract. Pamarot was the undisputed first-choice center-back during his first season with the Valencian, who finished 19th and were immediately relegated back. In mid-July 2011, he signed with another top-division club, Granada CF. Pamarot only played twice for Granada and returned to Hércules to play out the rest of his career in the Segunda División. Pamarot made another 50 appearances for the club before retiring.

Honours
Portsmouth
FA Cup: 2007–08

References

External links
Granada official profile 

BBC profile

1979 births
Living people
People from Fontenay-sous-Bois
Footballers from Val-de-Marne
Association football central defenders
French footballers
Ligue 1 players
FC Martigues players
OGC Nice players
Premier League players
Portsmouth F.C. players
Tottenham Hotspur F.C. players
La Liga players
Segunda División players
Hércules CF players
Granada CF footballers
French expatriate footballers
French expatriate sportspeople in England
French expatriate sportspeople in Spain
Expatriate footballers in England
Expatriate footballers in Spain